Paisa is a monetary unit in South Asia.

Paisa may also refer to:
 Indian paisa, Indian monetary unit
 A person from the Paisa Region of Colombia
 An inmate of one of the prisons in Honduras who did not belong to a street gang
 Paisa (2014 film), a Telugu film
 Paisa (2016 film), a Tamil film
 Paisà, a 1946 Italian film directed by Roberto Rossellini, released in English as Paisan

See also
 Paisa Paisa (disambiguation)